Stanley railway station was located in Newsham Park to the north of Prescot Road on the Canada Dock Branch, Fairfield, Liverpool, England. It opened on 1 July 1870 and closed to passengers on 31 May 1948.

References

Sources

External links
 The station and local lines on multiple maps Rail Maps Online
 The station on an Edwardian 25" OS map National Library of Scotland
 The branch with stations and mileages Railway Codes

Disused railway stations in Liverpool
Former London and North Western Railway stations
Railway stations in Great Britain opened in 1870
Railway stations in Great Britain closed in 1948